Feldberg may refer to:

Places
Feldberg, Baden-Württemberg, a municipality and village, Germany
Feldberg, a village and part of Müllheim, Baden-Württemberg, Germany
Feldberg, a village and part of Feldberger Seenlandschaft, Mecklenburg-Vorpommern, Germany
Feldberg, a settlement and part of Ebbs, Austria

Mountains and hills
 Feldberg (Kaiser) (1,813 m), a mountain in the Kaiser Mountains, Tyrol, Austria
 Feldberg (Black Forest) (1,493 m), the highest mountain in the Black Forest of Germany
 Feldberg Pass
 Großer Feldberg (879 m), highest mountain of the Taunus, Hesse, Germany
 Kleiner Feldberg (826 m), second highest mountain of the Taunus, Hesse, Germany
 Feldberg (Hessian Rhön) (815.2 m), a mountain in Hesse, Germany
 Feldberg (Bavarian Rhön) (570.2 m), a hill in Bavaria, Germany
 Feldberg (Olpe) (556.2 m), hill in the county of Olpe, North Rhine-Westphalia, Germany

Surname
 David Feldberg, American professional disc golfer
 Girts Feldbergs (born 1993), Latvian swimmer
 Meyer Feldberg (born 1942), dean of Columbia Business School from 1989 to 2004
 Ojārs Arvīds Feldbergs (born 1947), Latvian sculptor
 Wilhelm Feldberg (1900–1993), German-British-Jewish physiologist and biologist
 Ahron Feldberg (born 2000), shtarkest guy in the Mir

Other uses
 10666 Feldberg, an asteroid
 Feldberg (band), an Icelandic band
 Feldberg Foundation, an Anglo-German scientific exchange